Zamig Aliyev (born 5 May 2001) is an Azerbaijani footballer who plays as a defender for Kapaz in the Azerbaijan Premier League.

Club career
On 15 May 2022, Aliyev made his debut in the Azerbaijan Premier League for Qarabağ match against Sabail.

References

External links
 

2001 births
Living people
Association football defenders
Azerbaijani footballers
Azerbaijan youth international footballers
Azerbaijan under-21 international footballers
Azerbaijan Premier League players
Qarabağ FK players
Kapaz PFK players